First Ward can refer to:

 1st Ward of New Orleans, a ward of New Orleans
 First Ward, Charlotte, a ward of Charlotte, North Carolina
 First Ward, Houston, a neighborhood of Houston
 Ward 1 of the District of Columbia, a ward of Washington, D.C.
 Ward 1, St. Louis City, an aldermanic ward of St. Louis
 Ward 1, the name of several wards of Zimbabwe
 Ward 1 (Vietnam) (disambiguation), name of several wards in Vietnam
 First Ward, Binghamton, a neighborhood in Binghamton, New York
 Orléans Ward, Ottawa (also known as Ward 1)